The Mexican Secretariat of Public Security or Secretariat of Public Safety, also known as Ministry of Public Security and Ministry of Public Safety (SSP), was the federal ministry of the Mexican Executive Cabinet that aimed to preserve freedom, order, and public peace and safeguard the integrity and rights of the people. The Assistant Attorney General uses the Powers of the Union to prevent the commission of crimes, develop public security policies of the Federal Executive, propose policies on crime, administer the federal prison system, and administer justice to juvenile offenders based on the Organic Law of the Federal Public Administration and other federal laws, regulations, decrees, agreements, and orders of the President of the Republic. It had its headquarters in Álvaro Obregón, Mexico City.

Then-President-elect Enrique Peña Nieto announced on November 15, 2012, that he would eliminate the Secretariat of Public Security, as part of his planned administrative reforms, after taking office. It was dissolved on January 3, 2013, and was replaced by the "National Security Commission", an internal organ of the Secretariat of the Interior as seen on its website.

Coinciding with new president Andrés Manuel López Obrador taking office, a new Secretariat of Security and Civilian Protection was established in 2018.

Functions 
The Secretariat will plan and conduct their activities in accordance with the objectives, strategies and priorities, National Development Plans and the National Program are issued by the Head of the Federal Executive. According to Organic Law of the Federal Civil Service in its 'Article 30a' has an office on the following main functions, to develop security policies and propose public policy on crime at the federal level, including the rules, instruments and actions to effectively prevent the commission of crimes, to propose Federal Executive measures to ensure consistency of policy between the criminal divisions of the federal public service, chairing the National Council for Public Security, at the Council of National Security, policies, actions and strategies of coordination in the field of crime prevention and criminal justice policy for the entire national territory, dealing expeditiously with complaints and citizens' complaints regarding the exercise of its powers, organize, manage, administer and monitor the PFP and to ensure the honest performance of their staff and implement its disciplinary system, safeguard the integrity and heritage of the people, prevent the commission of federal crimes, and to preserve the Freedom, order and public peace, establish a system to collect, analyze, examine and process information for the prevention of crime, using methods that ensure strict adherence to human rights and run the penalties for federal crimes and to administer the federal prison system, as well as organize and conduct activities to support the released.

Organization 
For the study, planning, and dispatching of the matters within its competence, the Secretariat will be composed of the following administrative units and bodies:

 I. Subsecretary Strategy and Police Intelligence;
 II. Subsecretary Prevention, Linkage and Human Rights;
 III. Subsecretary Federal Prison System;
 IV. Subsecretary Assessment and Institutional Development;
 V. Major Official;
 VI. General Coordination of Legal Affairs;
 VII. General Coordination of Mexico Shelf;
 VIII. General Directorate of Social Communication;
 IX. Directorate General for International Affairs;
 X. Directorate General for Coordination and Development of State and Municipal police;
 XI. Directorate General of Private Security;
 XII. General Crime Prevention;
 XIII. DG Entailment and Civic Participation;
 XIV. Directorate General of Human Rights;
 XV. General Directorate of Standardization and Development Facility;
 XVI. General Directorate of Security Transfer of Offenders and Prison;
 XVII. Directorate General of Planning and Evaluation;
 XVIII. Directorate General of Transparency and Regulatory Improvement;
 XIX. General Directorate of Professional Police Career and regulations;
 XX. Directorate General of Planning and Budget Organization;
 XXI. Directorate General of Human Resources;
 XXII. Department of Material Resources and General Services;
 XXIII. Directorate General of Public Works and Services;
 XXIV. Directorate General of Administrative Systems and
 XXV. Decentralized administrative bodies:
 a) Federal Police;
 b) Executive Secretary of the National System of Public Security;
 c) Prevention and Social Rehabilitation and
 d) Council of Children.

List of secretaries 
 President Vicente Fox Quesada
 (2000 - 2004) : Alejandro Gertz Manero
 (2004 - 2005) : Ramón Martín Huerta
 (2005 - 2006) : Eduardo Medina Mora
 President Felipe Calderón Hinojosa
 (2006 - 2012): Genaro García Luna
 President Enrique Peña Nieto
 (2012 - 2013): Manuel Mondragón y Kalb

Sources

External links 
Official Website of Public Security
Official site of the President's Cabinet

Public Safety
2000 establishments in Mexico
2013 disestablishments in Mexico